Irlbach is a municipality in the district of Straubing-Bogen in Bavaria, Germany. It lies on the Danube River.

References

Straubing-Bogen
Populated places on the Danube